Alexander Murray Hannum (July 19, 1923 – January 18, 2002) was a professional basketball player and coach. Hannum coached two National Basketball Association (NBA) teams and one American Basketball Association (ABA) team to league championships. He had a combined NBA-ABA record of 649–564 (.535) in the regular season and 61–46 (.570) in the playoffs over 16 seasons. In 1998, he was inducted into the Naismith Memorial Basketball Hall of Fame as a coach.

High school career
Hannum prepped at Hamilton High School in Los Angeles.

College career
Hannum played at USC, where he was captain of the 1948 team.

Professional career
Hannum played in the NBA between 1949 and 1957. After a season with the Oshkosh All-Stars, followed by the formation of the National Basketball Association, he played for several NBA teams and scored more than 3,000 points.

Hannum is one of only three NBA players to receive more than six personal fouls in a single game (Don Otten and Cal Bowdler are the others). On December 26, 1950, Hannum received seven personal fouls in a game against the Boston Celtics.

Coaching career
Midway through the 1956–57 season, Hannum was named player-coach of the St. Louis Hawks. He was actually the Hawks' third head coach that year. Red Holzman had been fired midway through the season in favor of Hannum's teammate, Slater Martin. However, Martin didn't want to be a coach and a player, and gave up the reins after only eight games. Hannum led the team to a 15–16 record for the rest of the season. Despite a losing overall record, the West was so weak that year (no team finished with a winning record) that the Hawks actually won the division title. They advanced all the way to the NBA Finals and lost to the Boston Celtics in seven games.

Hannum retired as a player after that season. A year later, led by Bob Pettit and Martin, the Hawks won their only NBA Championship over the Celtics in the NBA Finals. It is one of the only two seasons in Bill Russell's 13-year career in which the Celtics' center did not win an NBA championship.

Hannum coached the Wichita Vickers of the AAU National Industrial Basketball League in the 1958–59 and 1959–60 season. He returned to the NBA in 1960 with the Syracuse Nationals, advancing to the Eastern finals in his first season and losing in the first round two years in a row.

In 1964, Hannum was named NBA Coach of the Year while with the San Francisco Warriors after leading them to the Finals against the Celtics.

In 1966, Hannum was named the head coach of the Philadelphia 76ers. That team had moved from Syracuse three years earlier. He succeeded Dolph Schayes, who had been named coach after the move from Central New York. During his first season as coach, the 76ers had a record setting season as they started 46–4, en route to a record of 68–13, the best record in league history at the time. After a 129–103 win over the Pistons on March 3, 1967, he joined Red Auerbach as the only coaches to have won 60 games in a season at that period. Hannum led the Sixers towards the 63rd victory, breaking the NBA-record for most wins in a single season, in an OT win over the Boston Celtics. On March 14, 1967, he became the first coach to have won 65 games in a season. Hannum then coached the Wilt Chamberlain-led Philadelphia 76ers to the NBA championship, ending the eight-year title streak of the Boston Celtics. The 1967 Championship made him the first of only three head coaches in NBA history to win championships with two different teams (the other two are Phil Jackson and Pat Riley).

In 1968 Hannum was named head coach and executive vice president of the Oakland Oaks of the American Basketball Association. Hannum coached the Rick Barry-led Oaks to the 1969 ABA Championship, becoming the first of two coaches to win championships in both the NBA and ABA. Hannum won the ABA Coach of the Year honors the same season.

Hannum left his position as head coach of the San Diego Rockets of the NBA to become president, general manager and head coach of the ABA's Denver Rockets on April 8, 1971. In his first season the Rockets lost their opening playoff match to the Texas Chaparrals. On June 13, 1972, Hannum bought control of the Rockets with A.G. "Bud" Fischer and Frank M. Goldberg. In the 1972–73 season Hannum coached the Rockets to the 1973 ABA Playoffs where they lost in the first round of the Western Division playoffs to the Indiana Pacers, 4 games to 1. Hannum returned the Rockets to the 1974 ABA Playoffs where they lost to the San Diego Conquistadors. On April 30, 1974, Hannum was dismissed as president, general manager and head coach of the Rockets.

Hannum's combined record (NBA and ABA), was 649–564 (.535) with a 61–46 record (.570) in the playoffs on 11 trips in 16 seasons.

Honors
Hannum was inducted into the Naismith Memorial Basketball Hall of Fame in 1998.

Thirteen Hall-of-Famers played for Hannum. In addition to Pettit, Chamberlain and Barry, he had also coached Cliff Hagan, Ed Macauley, Slater Martin, Dolph Schayes, Nate Thurmond, Billy Cunningham, Hal Greer, Elvin Hayes, Calvin Murphy and Chet Walker.

Personal life
Hannum, a native of Los Angeles, and graduate of the University of Southern California, died at the age of 78 in San Diego.

Head coaching record

|-
| style="text-align:left;"|St. Louis
| style="text-align:left;"|
| 31||15||16|||| style="text-align:center;"|1st in Western||10||6||4||
| style="text-align:center;"|Lost in NBA Finals
|- style="background:#FDE910;"
| style="text-align:left;"|St. Louis
| style="text-align:left;"|
| 72||41||31|||| style="text-align:center;"|1st in Western||11||8||3||
| style="text-align:center;"|Won NBA Finals
|-
| style="text-align:left;"|Syracuse
| style="text-align:left;"|
| 79||38||41|||| style="text-align:center;"|3rd in Eastern||8||4||4||
| style="text-align:center;"|Lost Division Finals
|-
| style="text-align:left;"|Syracuse
| style="text-align:left;"|
| 80||41||39|||| style="text-align:center;"|3rd in Eastern||5||2||3||
| style="text-align:center;"|Lost Division Semifinals
|-
| style="text-align:left;"|Syracuse
| style="text-align:left;"|
| 80||48||32|||| style="text-align:center;"|2nd in Eastern||8||4||4||
| style="text-align:center;"|Lost Division Semifinals
|-
| style="text-align:left;"|San Francisco
| style="text-align:left;"|
| 80||48||32|||| style="text-align:center;"|1st in Western||8||4||4||
| style="text-align:center;"|Lost in NBA Finals
|-
| style="text-align:left;"|San Francisco
| style="text-align:left;"|
| 80||17||63|||| style="text-align:center;"|5th in Western||—||—||—||—
| style="text-align:center;"|Missed playoffs
|-
| style="text-align:left;"|San Francisco
| style="text-align:left;"|
| 80||35||45|||| style="text-align:center;"|4th in Western||—||—||—||—
| style="text-align:center;"|Missed playoffs
|- style="background:#FDE910;"
| style="text-align:left;"|Philadelphia
| style="text-align:left;"|
| 81||68||13|||| style="text-align:center;"|1st in Eastern||15||11||4||
| style="text-align:center;"|Won NBA Finals
|-
| style="text-align:left;"|Philadelphia
| style="text-align:left;"|
| 82||62||20|||| style="text-align:center;"|1st in Eastern||13||7||6||
| style="text-align:center;"|Lost Division Finals
|- style="background:#FDE910;"
| style="text-align:left;"|Oakland
| style="text-align:left;"|
| 78||60||18|||| style="text-align:center;"|1st in Western||16||12||4||
| style="text-align:center;"|Won ABA Finals
|-
| style="text-align:left;"|San Diego
| style="text-align:left;"|
| 56||18||38|||| style="text-align:center;"|7th in Western||—||—||—||—
| style="text-align:center;"|Missed playoffs
|-
| style="text-align:left;"|San Diego
| style="text-align:left;"|
| 82||40||42|||| style="text-align:center;"|3rd in Pacific||—||—||—||—
| style="text-align:center;"|Missed playoffs
|-
| style="text-align:left;"|Denver
| style="text-align:left;"|
| 84||34||50|||| style="text-align:center;"|4th in Western||7||3||4||
| style="text-align:center;"|Lost Division Semifinals
|-
| style="text-align:left;"|Denver
| style="text-align:left;"|
| 84||47||37|||| style="text-align:center;"|3rd in Western||5||1||4||
| style="text-align:center;"|Lost Division Semifinals
|-
| style="text-align:left;"|Denver
| style="text-align:left;"|
| 84||37||47|||| style="text-align:center;"|4th in Western||—||—||—||—
| style="text-align:center;"|Missed playoffs
|- class="sortbottom"
| style="text-align:center;" colspan="2"|Career
| 1,213||649||564|||| ||107||61||46||

References

External links

 Basketball Reference statistics (as a coach)
 

1923 births
2002 deaths
Amateur Athletic Union men's basketball players
American men's basketball coaches
American men's basketball players
Baltimore Bullets (1944–1954) players
Basketball coaches from California
Basketball players from Los Angeles
Centers (basketball)
Denver Rockets head coaches
Fort Wayne Pistons players
Indianapolis Jets draft picks
Milwaukee Hawks players
Naismith Memorial Basketball Hall of Fame inductees
National Basketball Association championship-winning head coaches
Oakland Oaks executives
Oakland Oaks head coaches
Oshkosh All-Stars players
Philadelphia 76ers head coaches
Player-coaches
Power forwards (basketball)
Rochester Royals players
San Diego Rockets head coaches
San Francisco Warriors head coaches
St. Louis Hawks head coaches
St. Louis Hawks players
Syracuse Nationals head coaches
Syracuse Nationals players
USC Trojans men's basketball players